The 1992 Moldovan "A" Division was the 1st season of the Moldovan second-tier football league. A total of 11 teams contested the league.

League table

Note: Goals scored and goals conceded do not add up. 309 goals for vs. 320 goals against.

References

Moldovan Liga 1 seasons
2
Moldova